Mishari bin Rashed Alafasy is a Kuwaiti qāriʾ (reciter of the Quran), imam, preacher, and nasheed artist. He studied in the Islamic University of Madinah's College of Qur'an, specializing in the ten qira'at and tafsir. Alafasy has released nasheed albums. He usually sings in Arabic but he has also sung nasheeds in English, French and Japanese.

Awards and recognition
On 25 October 2008, Alafasy was awarded the first Arab Creativity Oscar by the Arab Creativity Union in Egypt. The event was sponsored by the Secretary-General of the Arab League, Amr Moussa as a recognition of Alafasy's role in promoting Islamic principles and teachings.

Alafasy was also voted by readers to be the Best Qur'an Reciter in the 2012 About.com Readers' Choice Awards.

See also
 Mishary Al-Arada

References

External links

 Nasheed From "Hearts Be Merciful Album"(2012)
Alafasy's Ramadan nasheed,  August 2009
 Recitation by Sheikh Mishary Rashed Al-afasy
 Recitation Of Mishari
Alafasy Albums
Alafasy  Recitations on Islamway
 SunniPath  Library – Quran Recitation by Mishary Rashed al-Efasy
 Info of Sheikh Mishary Rashed Al-afasy

Living people
1976 births
Islamic University of Madinah alumni
Kuwaiti Sunni Muslims
Kuwaiti Muslims
Kuwaiti Islamists
 Kuwaiti Quran reciters
Kuwaiti imams